Trnovče is a village in the municipality of Velika Plana, Serbia. According to the 2002 census, the village has a population of 1060 people.

References

Populated places in Podunavlje District